Carambola's Philosophy: In the Right Pocket (also known as The Crazy Adventures of Len and Coby and Trinity and Carambola) is a 1975 Italian comedic Spaghetti Western film co-written and directed by Ferdinando Baldi and starring the duo Michael Coby and Paul L. Smith. It is the sequel of Carambola!.

Cast 

Michael Coby as Coby   
Paul L. Smith as  Len  
Glauco Onorato as The Supreme
 Gabriella Andreini as Miss Peabody
Remo Capitani as  Word 
Pino Ferrara as  Sheriff
Piero Lulli as  Colonel 
 Enzo Monteduro as  Jones
 Benjamin Lev as  Sheriff's Assistant

See also 
 List of Italian films of 1975

References

External links

1970s buddy comedy films
1970s Western (genre) comedy films
Films directed by Ferdinando Baldi
Italian buddy comedy films
Italian sequel films
Spaghetti Western films
Films scored by Fabio Frizzi
1975 comedy films
1975 films
1970s Italian-language films
1970s Italian films